Bronner is a surname. Notable people with the surname include:

 Augusta Fox Bronner (1881–1966), American psychologist and author
 David Bronner (born 1973), American soap company executive and activist
 David G. Bronner (born 1945), American businessman
 E. H. Bronner (1908–1997), soapmaker
 Ethan Bronner (born 1954), American journalist
 Gerhard Bronner (1922–2007), Austrian composer
 Leila Leah Bronner (1930–2019), American Jewish historian and biblical scholar
 Liza Brönner (born 1989), Afrikaans singer and songwriter
 Oscar Bronner (born 1943), Austrian newspaper editor, son of Gerhard
 Rudolph Bronner (1890–1960), Australian broadcasting executive
 Simon J. Bronner (born 1954), American folklorist, historian, educator, and author
 Stephen Bronner (born 1949), American political philosopher and professor

See also 
 Dr. Bronner's Magic Soaps
 Till Brönner, German jazz musician
 Bronner (grape), a grape variety
 Bronner Bros., one of the largest private African-American hair and skin care producers
 Bronner's Christmas Wonderland, a Christmas store in Michigan
 Brunner (surname)
 Brenner (disambiguation)

German-language surnames